DaJuan Jamar Morgan (born October 21, 1985) is a former gridiron football safety. He was drafted by the Kansas City Chiefs in the third round of the 2008 NFL Draft. He played college football at North Carolina State.

Morgan was also a member of the Indianapolis Colts, New York Jets and Montreal Alouettes.

External links
Just Sports Stats
Draft Profile
Combine Profile
NFL Draft Scout
CBSSports Draft Profile
NC State Wolfpack bio

1985 births
Living people
Sportspeople from West Palm Beach, Florida
African-American players of American football
Players of American football from Florida
American football safeties
NC State Wolfpack football players
Kansas City Chiefs players
Indianapolis Colts players
New York Jets players
Montreal Alouettes players